Herman L. Gilliam Jr. (May 5, 1946 – April 16, 2005) was an American professional basketball player. He was born in Winston-Salem, North Carolina.

College career

Herm Gilliam attended Purdue University, located in West Lafayette, Indiana. He played under head coach George King and alongside Billy Keller and three-time All-American Rick Mount. He was an honored co-captain of the Boilermakers in both his junior and senior years and helped lead the Boilers to an NCAA Finals appearance in 1969. He led Purdue with 8.5 rebounds per game his senior season and received First Team All-Big Ten honors. He twice received Purdue's Most Valuable Player award and was the recipient of the Ward Lambert Scholarship Trophy for scholastic excellence. In three varsity seasons at Purdue, the 6'3" and 190 lb guard scored 1,118 points and finished his collegiate career in 5th place among the school's all-time scoring leaders, averaging 16 points a game. After his junior season, Herm declined to leave before his senior year for a chance to play for the Chicago Bulls, whom he was drafted by in the 13th round of the 1968 NBA draft. In 2006, he was inducted in the Purdue Athletic Hall of Fame.

Professional career

Cincinnati Royals, Buffalo Braves

Gilliam was selected by the Kentucky Colonels in the 1969 ABA draft and by the Cincinnati Royals in the first round (8th pick) of the 1969 NBA draft. He averaged 7.5 points a game in his rookie season while playing in Cincinnati. He missed the last few weeks of the season due to him serving six months of military duty. After his first season, Gilliam was selected by the Buffalo Braves, an expansion team, in the 1970 NBA Expansion Draft. He spent the 1970–71 season with Buffalo, averaging 11.2 points and just over 4 rebounds a game.

Atlanta Hawks

During his honeymoon, "Bitty", as he was known to teammates, was traded to the Atlanta Hawks on July 23, 1971 to start the 1971–72 season. Working with the likes of Lou Hudson and Pete Maravich in the backcourt, he averaged 10.2 points a game and had career high 83.8 free-throw percentage, connecting with 145 on the season. He scored his season high of 30 points vs. the Cleveland Cavaliers on March 19, 1972. Herm's best career season came during the 1972–73 campaign, where he averaged 14 points and 5.25 rebounds a game with a .468 field goal percentage, while leading the Hawks in steals. In his only season in which he scored over 1,000 points (1,665), he scored a career high 35 points against the Portland Trail Blazers on October 26, 1973. During his four seasons with Atlanta, he averaged 12.5 points a game, including his career high of 14.1 during the 1973–74 season.

Seattle SuperSonics, Portland Trail Blazers

On October 22, 1975, Gilliam was traded to the Seattle SuperSonics. Gilliam suffered from a knee injury during the 1975–76 season, but rallied back and scored his season high 24 points in a game. After an injury-prone season with the SuperSonics, Gilliam was traded to the Portland Trail Blazers, where he won an NBA championship ring with the likes of Bill Walton during his final season in 1977. Early in the season Gilliam was unhappy with his playing time. However, he refused a trade to New Orleans, a team which promised him more playing time, to stay in Portland, as he felt the Trail Blazers gave him a greater chance at winning a championship. Gilliam's best game of the season came in game four of the Western Conference Finals against the Los Angeles Lakers, where he scored 24 points on 12 of 18 shooting from the field. David Halberstam described his contributions in this game in his book The Breaks of the Game.

Retirement

After retiring from the NBA, he took a job with United Parcel Service where he worked for 15 years, eventually being promoted to managing the company's Corvallis–Albany hub.

Gilliam died of a heart attack on April 16, 2005 in Salem, Oregon.

References

External links
Herm Gilliam Remembered @ NBA.com
NBA stats @ databasebasketball.com
High Flyer: Gilliam Remembered As Fine Athlete, Person by Off the BASN Sports Wire By John Delong. Posted April 25, 2005

1946 births
2005 deaths
African-American basketball players
American men's basketball players
Atlanta Hawks players
Basketball players from Winston-Salem, North Carolina
Buffalo Braves expansion draft picks
Buffalo Braves players
Chicago Bulls draft picks
Cincinnati Royals draft picks
Cincinnati Royals players
Kentucky Colonels draft picks
Point guards
Portland Trail Blazers players
Purdue Boilermakers men's basketball players
Seattle SuperSonics players
Shooting guards
Sportspeople from Salem, Oregon
20th-century African-American sportspeople
21st-century African-American people